Barilepis is a genus of flower weevils in the beetle family Curculionidae. There are at least four described species in Barilepis.

Species
These four species belong to the genus Barilepis:
 Barilepis apacheana Casey, 1920
 Barilepis grisea (LeConte, 1876)
 Barilepis griseus Casey, T.L., 1920
 Barilepis virginica Casey, 1920

References

Further reading

 
 
 

Baridinae
Articles created by Qbugbot